The Administration of Union Territory of Ladakh (sic) is the governing authority of the Indian union territory of Ladakh and its two districts. The Administration is led by a Lieutenant Governor appointed by the President of India who acts on behalf of the central Government of India. Ladakh does not have an elected legislative assembly. The two districts of Ladakh both elect their own autonomous district council-the Leh Autonomous Hill development council and the Kargil Autonomous Hill development Council, which have competence over a range of domestic affairs.

History of Ladakh

Ladakh became part of the Dominion of India on 26 October 1947 as a region of the State of Jammu and Kashmir. The status of the region was degraded to that of a Revenue and Administrative Division of Jammu and Kashmir in February 2019 and Ladakh became a union territory in its own right on 31 October 2019.

Executive and legislative authority
Ladakh is administered as a union territory without a legislative assembly by virtue of Article 240 (2) of the Constitution of India and under the terms of the Jammu and Kashmir Reorganisation Act, 2019. Union territory of Ladakh will be administered by the President acting through a Lieutenant Governor to be appointed by him under Article 239. The President may make regulations for the peace, progress and good government of the Union territory of Ladakh under article 240. The Lieutenant Governor shall be assisted by advisor(s) to be appointed by the
Central Government.

Judiciary and law enforcement
Ladakh is under the jurisdiction of the Jammu and Kashmir High Court which sits in Jammu and Srinagar. Law enforcement is the responsibility of the Ladakh Police which is under the authority of the Ministry of Home Affairs of the Government of India.

Office holders
Lieutenant Governor of Ladakh - Radha Krishna Mathur
Advisor to the Lieutenant Governor - Umang Narula
Principal Secretary - Dr. Pawan Kotwal, IAS
Commissioner Secretary - Ajeet Kumar Sahu, IAS
Divisional Commissioner - Saugat Biswas, IAS
Inspector General of Police - S. S. Khandare, IPS
Secretary - Ravinder Kumar, IAS
Secretary - Padma Angmo, IIS
Secretary - K. Mehboob Ali Khan, IRS
Deputy Commissioner Kargil District - Santosh Sukhadeve
Chairman/Chief Executive Councillor, LAHDC Kargil - Feroz Ahmed Khan
Deputy Commissioner Leh District - Shrikant Balasaheb Suse
Chairman/Chief Executive Councillor, LAHDC Leh  - Tashi Gyalson

See also

 List of districts of Ladakh
 Geography of Ladakh
 Tourism in Ladakh

References

External links
Official website

Government of Ladakh